Lewiston is a city in Cache County, Utah, United States. It is situated at the northern Utah border and borders the state of Idaho. The population was 1,766 at the 2010 census. It is included in the Logan, Utah-Idaho (partial) Metropolitan Statistical Area.

Geography
According to the United States Census Bureau, the city has a total area of 25.7 square miles (66.5 km2), of which 25.6 square miles (66.2 km2) is land and 0.1 square mile (0.3 km2) (0.43%) is water.

Climate
This climatic region is typified by large seasonal temperature differences, with warm to hot (and often humid) summers and cold (sometimes severely cold) winters.  According to the Köppen Climate Classification system, Lewiston has a humid continental climate, abbreviated "Dfb" on climate maps.

Demographics

As of the census of 2000, there were 1,877 people, 531 households, and 446 families residing in the city. There were 558 housing units at an average density of 21.8 per square mile (8.4/km2). The racial makeup of the city was 94.67% White, 0.11% African American, 0.05% Native American, 0.11% Asian, 3.68% from other races, and 1.39% from two or more races. Hispanic or Latino of any race were 6.29% of the population.

There were 531 households, out of which 53.3% had children under the age of 18 living with them, 75.0% were married couples living together, 6.8% had a female householder with no husband present, and 16.0% were non-families. 14.3% of all households were made up of individuals, and 7.3% had someone living alone who was 65 years of age or older. The average household size was 3.53 and the average family size was 3.94.

In the city, the population was spread out, with 39.4% under the age of 18, 12.3% from 18 to 24, 24.7% from 25 to 44, 14.5% from 45 to 64, and 9.1% who were 65 years of age or older. The median age was 24 years. For every 100 females, there were 101.2 males. For every 100 females age 18 and over, there were 94.9 males.

The median income for a household in the city was $36,417, and the median income for a family was $41,705. Males had a median income of $28,750 versus $22,083 for females. The per capita income for the city was $12,385. About 8.7% of families and 10.2% of the population were below the poverty line, including 12.2% of those under age 18 and 9.0% of those age 65 or over.

See also

 List of cities and towns in Utah
 Amalgamated Sugar Company

References

External links

 

Cities in Cache County, Utah
Cities in Utah
Logan metropolitan area
Populated places established in 1870
1870 establishments in Utah Territory